This is a list of awards and nominations received by Jared Leto. As of March 2022, Jared Leto has been nominated for 100 awards, winning 43. His awards in music are credited to him and fellow rock band members of Thirty Seconds to Mars.

For his performance in Mr. Nobody (2009), Leto was listed as the runner-up for the Volpi Cup for Best Actor at the Venice Film Festival. He played trans woman Rayon in Jean-Marc Vallée's film Dallas Buyers Club, his first film role in five years. The film was released in November 2013, receiving acclaim from reviewers and roused nominations for major awards. Leto won the Critics' Choice Movie Award, Golden Globe Award, Screen Actors Guild Award, and Academy Award—all for Best Supporting Actor.

Leto played serial killer Albert Sparma in John Lee Hancock's film The Little Things (2021), which earned him nominations for a Golden Globe Award  and Screen Actors Guild Award—both for Best Supporting Actor. The same year, Leto portrays fashion designer and business magnate Paolo Gucci in Ridley Scott's biographical crime drama film House of Gucci, for which he was nominated for a Satellite Award, Critics' Choice Movie Award and Screen Actors Guild Award.

Awards and nominations

See also
 List of awards and nominations received by Thirty Seconds to Mars

References

External links
 Jared Leto – Awards at IMDb

Awards
Leto, Jared
Leto, Jared